
Steve Jobs (February 24, 1955 – October 5, 2011) appeared in numerous speaking engagements, interviews, media appearances, and product introductions throughout his life. He spoke about a vast array of subjects including technology, entrepreneurship, society, philosophy, education, communication, movies, music, television, role models, industry, etc.

Interviews, appearances, and speaking engagements

See also
How to Grow an Apple: Did Steve Jobs Speak Apple to Success? Aalborg University, Lotte Skjøttgaard Sørensen, 2013

References

Jobs